This is the list of medalists at the European Shotgun Championships from the first edition held in 1929 (until 1954 the European Shotgun Championships were held in pigeon shooting and only from 1955, they take place in the current configuration).

Events
The events have almost always been the following three male and female, individual and team. Only from the 2016 edition are there two new mixed team races in trap and skeet.

 Trap (men and women, individual and team)
 Double trap (men and women, individual and team)
 Skeet (men and women, individual and team)

Men

Trap individual

Trap team

Double trap individual

Double trap team

Skeet individual

Skeet team

Women

Trap individual

Trap team

Double trap individual

Double trap team

Skeet individual

Skeet team

See also
 List of medalists at the European Shooting Championships

References

External links
 
 European Champion Archive Results at Sport-komplett-de

European
European